Martín Piroyansky (born 3 March 1986) is an Argentine actor and film director. He has appeared in more than forty films since 1998.

Selected filmography

References

External links 

1986 births
Living people
Argentine male film actors
Argentine film directors
Argentine people of Russian-Jewish descent